Sturton is a village in the civil parish of Scawby, North Lincolnshire, England.

During the 19th century Kelly's Directory noted that Sturton was a hamlet in the parish of Scawby-cum-Sturton, which also included the hamlet of Scawby Brook,  to the north-east. The railway station for Sturton and Scawby on the Gainsborough to Brigg line lies within Sturton,  to the south. The station and line was part of the Manchester, Sheffield and Lincolnshire Railway.

Sturton has three Grade II listed farmhouses: c.1849 Station Farmhouse, late 18th-century Home Farmhouse, and late 18th-century Manor Farmhouse.

References

Villages in the Borough of North Lincolnshire